" Kelly Street" is a song by Australian indie pop group Frente!. The single was released in October 1992 ahead of their debut studio album, Marvin the Album (24 November). The title includes an unintentional misspelling of "accidentally" that the band decided to keep. It peaked at  4 on both the Australian and New Zealand Singles Charts, and it was a minor hit in the United Kingdom in 1994, peaking at No. 80 on the UK Singles Chart.

Background and release
Frente! had formed in 1989 by Simon Austin on guitar and backing vocals, Angie Hart on lead vocals, Tim O'Connor on bass guitar and Mark Picton on drums and recorder. O'Connor was moving to a new address in Kenny Street, Richmond, Victoria – he mistakenly told his bandmates that it was Kelly Street; "I'm going to write a song about the house" he later told them. Hart suggested that he call it "Accidentally Kelly Street" and Mushroom Records dutifully printed off the single's labels with " Kelly Street", a mistake they decided to keep. Australian musicologist, Ian McFarlane, felt it was a "summery, sugar pop single" which was accompanied by "a breezy, slightly kooky video clip."

The single was released in October 1992 ahead of their debut studio album, Marvin the Album (24 November), while in the United Kingdom, the song was not released until 25 April 1994. Hart described it as "a really happy song for me. It's about making all the right decisions and feeling really confident about yourself." As for the title, she recalled "The mis-spelling was deemed by some a genius stroke. Unfortunately, it was not intentional on my part, but I quietly took the credit for years." Austin remembered the track as "perfect pop craft of Tim O'Connor – An undeniable hit song, it was all over the radio for weeks, sweet and sure against the Pacific Northwest snarl and doof doof cuppa-tea. Some of the sourest people I know and love took me to task but you could see they couldn't help singing it as they railed. I would nod, smile, press their shoulders."

" Kelly Street" peaked at No. 4 on both the Australian and New Zealand Singles Charts as well as No. 80 on the UK Singles Chart. McFarlane noticed that "The band was so popular that television comedy troupe the D-Generation was compelled to produce a spot-on send-up of the video." According to Jeff Jenkins The Late Shows parody, "Accidentally Was Released", featuring Jane Kennedy, Tony Martin, Mick Molloy and Tom Gleisner (formerly of The D-Generation) was a "savage send-up of the Kelly Street video" and Hart "soon fell out of love with the song." Austin initially "had a real moment of feeling stabbed... Then I thought, 'You know what? It's an Australian thing.' I know all those guys and they mean it lovingly. To a certain extent, as an Australian, you just have to suck it up. And it's good. People don't allow you to get too full of yourself, or full of yourself at all, or even half full of yourself."

Track listings

Australian 7-inch single
A. "Accidently Kelly Street"
B. "Ordinary Angels"

Australian cassette single
 "Accidently Kelly Street"
 "Many Wings" 
 "Here You Come Again"
 "Somethin' Stupid (Stoopid)"

UK CD single
 "Accidently Kelly Street"
 "Oh Brilliance"
 "Ordinary Angels"
 "Testimony"

Credits and personnel
Credits are taken from the UK CD single liner notes.

Studio
 Recorded at Platinum Studios (Melbourne)

Personnel

 Tim O'Connor – writing, bass guitar
 Angie Hart – lead vocals
 Simon Austin – guitar, backing vocals

 Mark Picton – drums
 Frente! – production
 Michael Koppelman – production, mixing, recording

Charts

Weekly charts

Year-end charts

Certifications

References

External links
 

1992 debut singles
1992 songs
Frente! songs
Mushroom Records singles